Bek is a crater on Mercury. It has a diameter of 32 kilometers. Its name was adopted by the International Astronomical Union (IAU) in 2010. Bek is named for the Egyptian sculptor Bek, who lived in the 14th century BCE.

Bek is north of Lermontov crater.

References

Impact craters on Mercury